Caloptilia acerivorella is a moth of the family Gracillariidae. It is known from Croatia, Tajikistan and Turkmenistan.

The larvae feed on Acer regeli and Acer turcomanicum. They mine the leaves of their host plant.

References

acerivorella
Moths of Europe
Moths of Asia
Moths described in 1956